Porioides is a genus of South Pacific dwarf sheet spiders that was first described by Norman I. Platnick in 1989.  it contains only two species, both found in New Zealand: P. rima and P. tasmani.

References

Araneomorphae genera
Hahniidae
Spiders of New Zealand